Robert Landry may refer to:
 Robert C. Landry (born 1962), Canadian jockey
 Robert Watson Landry (1922–2017), American politician in the Wisconsin State Assembly. 
 Robert B. Landry (1909–2000), United States Air Force general